Fr. Gaston Roberge (27 May 1935 – August 26, 2020) was a French Canadian Jesuit priest; film theorist; pioneer of the film appreciation movement in India; founder, with full support of Satyajit Ray, of Chitrabani (1970), the oldest media training institute of Eastern India; founder of the Media Research Centre (EMRC) of St. Xavier's College, Kolkata (1986); former president of Unda/OCIC-India; and author of over 35 books on cinema, communication, and spirituality. He made India his home and won an Indian National Film Award Special Mention for Best Writing on Cinema for the year 1998. The ceremony took place on 15 February 2000 and the awards were given by then President of India, K. R. Narayanan. Gaston Roberge was a close friend of Satyajit Ray

Education and early days
Roberge was born in Montreal, Quebec. He graduated from the University of Montreal, and did his Masters at UCLA. He joined the Society of Jesus (Jesuit Fathers) in 1956 and was sent to India on his request. He was the Executive Secretary for Social Communication, Headquarters of the Society of Jesus, Rome, till 1999.

Books 
 Chitra Bani
 Mass Communication and Man
 Films for an Ecology of Mind
 The Theory of Indian cinema
 Mediation: The Action of the Media in Our Society
 The Ways of Film Studies: Film Theory & the Interpretation of Films
 Satyajit Ray: Essays 1970-2005
 The Subject of Cinema
 Another cinema for another society
 Communication, Cinema, Development: From Morosity to Hope
 Les aventures de Kat Mandou
 Woman of Light To View Movies the Indian Way 
 The Indian Film Theory: Flames of Sholay, Notes and Beyond 
 The Compassionate Face of Meaning: Fragments for a Mosaic
 Cyberbani

Awards and accolades
 National Film Award Special Mention for Best Writing on Cinema
Lifetime Achievement Award by Bimal Roy Memorial & Film Society | "For establishing the unique enabling institution of Chitrabani and thus pioneering film academia in India as well as cultivating and nurturing several generations of cineastes and filmmakers."

Documentary on Fr. Gaston Roberge 
Master Preacher of Film Theory by National Award-winning filmmaker KG Das

References

External links
Gaston Roberge at IMDb
Gaston Roberge at Biblio
Gaston Roberge at Abe Books
Gaston Roberge on Amazon, UK
46th National Film Awards
 46th National Film Awards (PDF)

1935 births
2020 deaths
20th-century Canadian Jesuits
Canadian film critics
French Quebecers
Clergy from Montreal